Lara Jane Cox (born 1978) is an Australian actress, known for a variety of roles.  Cox played the role of Anita Scheppers in Heartbreak High, Doctor Denman in H2O: Just Add Water, and has appeared in Voodoo Lagoon and Kangaroo Jack.

She guest-starred in Home and Away playing intern Dr. Marie during the "Hospital Stalker" storyline. She also starred as Finn in the final season of The Lost World. In 2009 she starred in the thriller The Dinner Party. In 2017, she took over the role of Quinn Jackson on Home and Away. The character returned after 22 years, being played by Danielle Spencer in 1995. Quinn is the daughter of Alf Stewart.

She has done a television commercial for Lunesta (sleep aid drug) in the US, and is in an Australian television commercial for Hahn Super Dry.

Early life 
Cox was born in Canberra. She attended Daramalan College and Menai College. She was a model before she became an actress.

Filmography

Film

Television

References

External links 
 

1978 births
Living people
20th-century Australian actresses
21st-century Australian actresses
Actresses from Canberra
Australian child actresses
Australian film actresses
Australian television actresses
People educated at Daramalan College